Kazuya Shiojiri (born November 8, 1996) is a Japanese steeplechase and long-distance runner. He competed in the steeplechase at the 2016 Summer Olympics, but failed to reach the final. He won a bronze medal in this event at the 2018 Asian Games.

International competitions

References

External links 
 
 
 

1996 births
Living people
Japanese male steeplechase runners
Japanese male long-distance runners
Olympic male steeplechase runners
Olympic athletes of Japan
Athletes (track and field) at the 2016 Summer Olympics
Asian Games bronze medalists for Japan
Asian Games medalists in athletics (track and field)
Athletes (track and field) at the 2018 Asian Games
Medalists at the 2018 Asian Games
Universiade medalists in athletics (track and field)
Universiade bronze medalists for Japan
Medalists at the 2017 Summer Universiade
Japan Championships in Athletics winners
21st-century Japanese people